Chiridothrips is a genus of thrips in the family Phlaeothripidae.

Species
 Chiridothrips fabiani
 Chiridothrips hartwigi
 Chiridothrips indicus

References

Phlaeothripidae
Thrips
Thrips genera